In molecular biology, the HORMA domain (named after the Hop1p, Rev7p and MAD2 proteins) is a protein domain that has been suggested to recognise chromatin states resulting from DNA adducts, double stranded breaks or non-attachment to the spindle and act as an adaptor that recruits other proteins. Hop1 is a meiosis-specific protein, Rev7 is required for DNA damage induced mutagenesis, and MAD2 is a spindle checkpoint protein which prevents progression of the cell cycle upon detection of a defect in mitotic spindle integrity.

Examples 
Humans proteins containing this domain include:
 HORMAD1, HORMAD2, MAD2L1, MAD2L2

References

External links
 

Protein domains